Hibbert Binney (12 August 1819 – 30 April 1887) was a Canadian Church of England bishop. He was the fourth Bishop of Nova Scotia from 1851 to 1887.

Born in Sydney, Nova Scotia, the grandson of Hibbert Newton Binney and the son of the Reverend Hibbert Binney and Henrietta Amelia Stout. Hibbert Binney Sr. was the rector of St George's Church in Sydney. In 1823, Binney Sr. returned to England with his family to become rector of Newbury, Berkshire. Binney Jr. was educated at King's College London, and received a Bachelor of Arts degree from Worcester College, Oxford in 1842. He was ordained deacon by the Bishop of Oxford Richard Bagot in 1842 and was appointed a fellow of Worcester College. In 1844, he received his Master of Arts and was appointed tutor in 1846. In 1848, he became bursar of Worcester College.

In 1851, Binney was named Bishop of Nova Scotia and was consecrated in London by Archbishop John Bird Sumner of Canterbury and assisted by Bishops Blomfield of London, Wilberforce of Oxford, and Gilbert of Chichester.

He was married to Mary Bliss (1829–1903), she was the daughter of William Blowers Bliss and Sarah Ann Anderson.  Binney lived for years with Rosina in what is now known as the Black-Binney House, which is now a national historic site.

References

 

1819 births
1887 deaths
Alumni of King's College London
Alumni of Worcester College, Oxford
Anglican bishops of Nova Scotia and Prince Edward Island
20th-century Anglican Church of Canada bishops
Fellows of Worcester College, Oxford